Dmitri Alekseyevich Tolmachyov (born 25 February 1996) is a Russian football player.

Club career
He made his debut in the Russian Professional Football League for FC Baikal Irkutsk on 25 May 2015 in a game against FC Dynamo Barnaul. He made his Russian Football National League debut for Baikal on 12 March 2016 in a game against FC Yenisey Krasnoyarsk.

References

External links
 Profile by Russian Professional Football League

1996 births
Living people
Russian footballers
Association football defenders
FC Baikal Irkutsk players
FC Smena Komsomolsk-na-Amure players